Gech Su may refer to:
 Gech Su-ye Bala
 Gech Su-ye Pain